This is a partial list of Patti Page's recorded songs:

{| class="wikitable"
!width=30%|Song
!width=20%|Music by
!width=20%|Lyrics by
!width=5%|Year
!Notes
|-
! colspan=5|A
|-
|"All My Love (Bolero)"
|Paul Durand
|French: Henri ContetEnglish: Mitchell Parish
|1950
|-
|"Allegheny Moon"
|colspan=2|Al HoffmanDick Manning
|1956
|-
|"All the Time"
|colspan=2|Mel TillisWayne P. Walker
|1967
|-
|"Almost Persuaded"
|colspan=2|Glenn SuttonBilly Sherrill
|1966
|-
|"And So to Sleep Again"
|colspan=2|Joe MarsalaSunny Skylar
|1951
|-
|"Another Time, Another Place"
|Jay Livingston
|Ray Evans
|1958
|-
! colspan=5|B
|-
|"Back in Your Own Backyard"
|colspan=2|Al JolsonBilly RoseDave Dreyer
|1950
|-
|"Belonging to Someone"
|colspan=2|Al HoffmanDick Manning
|1958
|-
|"Boys' Night Out"
|Jimmy Van Heusen
|Sammy Cahn
|1962
|-
|"A Broken Heart and a Pillow Full of Tears"
| 
| 
|1961
|-
|"Butterflies"
|colspan=2|Bob Merrill
|1953
|-
! colspan=5|C
|-
|"Changing Partners"
|Larry Coleman
|Joe Darion
|1953
|-
|"A City Girl Stole My Country Boy"
| 
| 
|1961
|-
|"Come What May"
|Al Sanchez
|Allen Schiller
|1952
|-
|"Confess"
|colspan=2|Bennie BenjaminGeorge David Weiss
|1948
|-
|"Conquest"
|colspan=2|Corky Robbins
|1952
|Covered by The White Stripes on their 2007 album Icky Thump.
|-
|"Croce Di Oro(Cross of Gold)"
|colspan=2|James "Kim" Gannon
|1955
|-
|"Cross Over the Bridge"
|colspan=2|Bennie BenjaminGeorge David Weiss
|1954
|-
|"Custody"
| 
| 
|1966
|-
! colspan=5|D
|-
|"Detour"
|colspan=2|Paul Westmoreland
|1951
|-
|"The Doggie in the Window"
|colspan=2|Bob Merrill
|1953
|-
|"Don't Read the Letter"
| 
| 
|1961
|-
|"Down in the Valley"
|colspan=2|Traditional
|1955
|on her 1955 album Romance on the Range.
|-
|"Down the Trail of Achin' Hearts"
|colspan=2|	Jimmy KennedyNat Simon
|1951
|-
! colspan=5|E
|-
|"Ever True, Evermore"
| 
| 
|1951
|-
|"Every Time I Feel the Spirit"
| 
| 
|1956
|-
! colspan=5|F
|-
|"Father, Father"
| 
| 
|1953
|-
|"Fibbin'"
|Michael Merlo
|Patrick Welch
|1958
|-
! colspan=5|G
|-
|"Gentle on My Mind"
|colspan=2|John Hartford
|1968
|-
|"Give Him Love"
| 
| 
|1971
|-
|"Goodbye Charlie"
| 
| 
|1959
|-
|"Go on Home"
| 
| 
|1961
|-
|"Go on with the Wedding"
|colspan=2|Arthur KorbCharlie PurvisMilt Yakus
|1956
|-
! colspan=5|H
|-
|"Happy Birthday, Jesus"
| 
| 
|1967
|-
|"Hello, We're Lonely"
| 
| 
|1973
|-
|"Hush...Hush Sweet Charlotte"
|Frank DeVol
|Mack David
|1965
|-
! colspan=5|I
|-
|"I Can't Sit Still"
| 
| 
|1973
|-
|"I Can't Tell a Waltz from a Tango"
|colspan=2|Al HoffmanDick Manning
|1954
|covered in the United Kingdom by Alma Cogan, whose hit on the UK charts was bigger than Patti Page's was in the US
|-
|"I Cried"
|colspan=2|Michael EliasBilly Duke
|1954
|-
|"I Don't Care if the Sun Don't Shine"
|colspan=2|Mack David
|1950
|-
|"I'd Rather Be Sorry"
| 
| 
|1971
|-
|"I'll Keep the Lovelight Burning"
|colspan=2|Bennie BenjaminGeorge David Weiss
|1949
|-
|"I'll Remember Today"
|Edith Piaf
|William Engvick
|1957
|-
|"I May Not Be Lovin' You"
| 
| 
|1974
|-
|"In This Day and Age"
| 
| 
|1966
|-
|"I Take It Back"
|colspan=2|Buddy BuieJ. R. Cobb
|1967
|-
|"I Went to Your Wedding"
|colspan=2|Jessie Mae Robinson
|1952
|-
|"I Wish I'd Never Been Born"
| 
| 
|1960
|-
|"I Wish I Had a Mommy Like You"
| 
| 
|1970
|-
! colspan=5|K
|-
|"Keep Me in Mind"
|Burt Bacharach
|Jack Wolf
|1955
|-
! colspan=5|L
|-
|"Left Right Out of Your Heart(Hi Lee Hi Lo Hi Lup Up Up)"
|Mort Garson
|Earl Shuman
|1958
|-
|"Less than the Song"
| 
| 
|1975
|-
|"Let Me Go, Lover!"
|colspan=2|Jenny Lou CarsonAl Hill
|1954
|better-known version was recorded by Joan Weber
|-
|"Little Green Apples"
|colspan=2|Bobby Russell
|1968
|-
|"The Love Song"
| 
| 
|1969
|-
! colspan=5|M
|-
|"Mad About the Boy"
|colspan=2|Noël Coward
| 
|-
|"Make Me Your Kind of Woman"
| 
| 
|1971
|-
|"The Mama Doll Song"
|Nat Simon
|Charles Tobias
|1954
|-
|"Mama from the Train"
|colspan=2|Irving Gordon
|1956
|-
|"Milwaukee Polka"
| 
| 
|1953
|-
|"Mister And Mississippi"
|colspan=2|Irving Gordon
|1951
|-
|"Mockin' Bird Hill"
|colspan=2|Vaughn Horton
|1951
|-
|"Mom and Dad's Waltz"
| 
| 
|1961
|-
|"Money, Marbles, and Chalk"
|colspan=2|Garner "Pop" Eckler
|1949
|-
|"Most People Get Married"
|Leon Carr
|Earl Shuman
|1962
|-
|"Music and Memories"
| 
| 
|1966
|-
|"My First Formal Gown"
| 
| 
|1956
|-
|"My Jealous Eyes"
| 
| 
|1953
|-
|"My Man Friday"
| 
| 
|1982
|-
|"My Restless Lover"
| 
| 
|1954
|-
! colspan=5|N
|-
|"No Aces"
| 
| 
|1981
|-
|"Now that I'm in Love"
| 
| 
|1953
|-
! colspan=5|O
|-
|"Old Cape Cod"
|colspan=2|Claire RothrockMilt YakusAllan Jeffrey
|1957
|-
|"Once in a While"
|Michael Edwards
|Bud Green
|1952
|-
|"One of Us (Will Weep Tonight)"
|Fred Tobias
|Clint Ballard, Jr.
|1960
|-
|"On the Inside"
| 
| 
|1981
|-
|"Oo! What You Do to Me"
| 
| 
|1953
|-
! colspan=5|P
|-
|rowspan=2|"A Poor Man's Roses (or a Rich Man's Gold)"
|rowspan=2 colspan=2|Bob HilliardMilton DeLugg
|1957
|-
|1981
|-
|"Pretty Boy Lonely"
| 
| 
|1963
|-
! colspan=5|R
|-
|"Repeat after Me"
| 
| 
|1957
|-
|"Retreat"
|colspan=2|Nancy FarnsworthTommy FurtadoAnita Boyer
|1952
|-
|"Ribbons and Roses"
| 
| 
|1965
|-
! colspan=5|S
|-
|"Same Old You"
| 
| 
|1967
|-
|"Say Something Sweet"
|colspan=2|Sid TepperRoy C. Bennett
|1948</td>
|-
|"Say Wonderful Things"
|Philip Green
|Norman Newell
|1963
|-
|"So In Love"
|colspan=2|Cole Porter
|1949
|-
|"Someone Came to See Me"
| 
| 
|1974
|-
|"Stand By Your Man"
|colspan=2|Tammy WynetteBilly Sherrill
|1968
|-
|"Steam Heat"
|colspan=2|Richard AdlerJerry Ross
|1954
|-
|"The Strangest Romance"
|colspan=2|Fay Tishman
|1956
|-
! colspan=5|T
|-
|"That Old Feeling"
|Sammy Fain
|Lew Brown
|1955
|-
|"The Tennessee Waltz"
|colspan=2|Redd StewartPee Wee King
|1950
|-
|"These Things I Offer You"
| 
| 
|1951
|-
|"Think Again"
| 
| 
|1971
|-
|"This Is My Song"
|colspan=2|Dick Charles
|1953
|-
|"Too Young to Go Steady"
| 
| 
|1956
|-
|"Trust in Me"
|colspan=2|Ned WeverMilton AgerJean Schwartz

|1958
|better-known version was recorded by Eddie Fisher
|-
|"Two Thousand Two Hundred Twenty-three Miles
| 
| 
|1960
|-
! colspan=5|W
|-
|"Walkin' - Just Walkin'"
| 
|| 
|1967
|-
|"The Wall"
|colspan=2|Oramay Diamond /Clyde Otis/Dave Dreyer 
|1957
|-
|"The Walls Have Ears"
| 
| 
|1959
|-
|"What A Dream"
|colspan=2|Chuck Willis
|1954
|-
|"Whispering Winds"
| 
| 
|1952
|-
|"Why Don't You Believe Me"
|colspan=2|Lew DouglasKing LaneyRoy Rodde
|1952
|better-known version was recorded by Joni James
|-
|rowspan=2|"With My Eyes Wide Open I'm Dreaming"
|rowspan=2|Harry Revel
|rowspan=2|Mack Gordon
|1950
|-
|1959
|-
|"Woman Left Lonely"
| 
| 
|1971
|-
|"Wondering"
|colspan=2|Jack Schafer
|1957
|-
|"Would I Love You (Love You, Love You)"
|Harold Spina
|Bob Russell
|1951
|-
! colspan=5|Y
|-
|"You Belong to Me"
|colspan=2|Pee Wee KingRedd StewartChilton Price
|1952</td>
better-known version was recorded by Jo Stafford
|-
|"You Can't Be True, Dear"
|Hans OttenKen Griffin
|German: Gerhard EbelerEnglish: Hal Cotten
|1965
|originally recorded in 1948 by Ken Griffin
|-
|"You'll Answer to Me"
| 
| 
|1961
|-
|"You're Gonna Hurt Me"
| 
| 
|1973
|}

Page, Patti